is a 1978 Japanese film. It was directed by Junya Sato and produced by Haruki Kadokawa.

Plot
A girl survives a massacre of villagers by Japanese soldiers in a remote mountain village.

Cast
 Ken Takakura as Takeshi Ajisawa
 Hiroko Yakushimaru as Yoriko Nagai
 Ryoko Nakano as Tomoko Ochi
 Rentarō Mikuni
 Hiroshi Tachi as Naruaki Oba
 Fumio Watanabe as Yoshida
 Taiji Tonoyama
 Takahiro Tamura as Takashi Urakawa, pressman
 Kazuo Kitamura as Nagakawa
 Hajime Hana as Muranaga
 Katsumasa Uchida
 Mizuho Suzuki as Kuga
 Hideji Otaki as Nomura
 Isao Natsuyagi as Kitano
 Richard Anderson as Roberts
 Shinsuke Ashida as Sakamoto
 Nobuo Kaneko as Mizoguchi
 Tatsuo Umemiya as Akio Izaki
 Mikio Narita as Tasuke Nakao
 Hiroki Matsukata as Minagawa
 Tetsuro Tamba as Wada

References

External links
 

Films directed by Junya Satō
1978 films
1970s Japanese-language films
Yakuza films
Films scored by Yuji Ohno
1970s Japanese films